Cogealac is a commune in Constanța County, Northern Dobruja, Romania.

The commune includes six villages:
 Cogealac (historical names: Domnești)
 Gura Dobrogei (historical names: Câvârgic)
 Râmnicu de Jos
 Râmnicu de Sus
 Tariverde (historical name: Dorotea)

The former village was populated by Dobrujan Germans until 1942 and it is now the site of the Colilia Monastery.

The Fântânele-Cogealac Wind Farm (with an installed nameplate capacity of 600 MW) is partly located on the territory of the commune.

On March 2, 2022, while searching for a crashed MiG-21 LanceR in the area, an IAR 330 military transport helicopter crashed near Gura Dobrogei, killing 7 military personnel.

Demographics
At the 2011 census, Cogealac had 4,466 Romanians (98.89%), 4 Turks (0.09%), 46 others (1.02%).

References

Communes in Constanța County
Localities in Northern Dobruja
Aromanian settlements in Romania
Place names of Turkish origin in Romania